Colo–NESCO Community School District is a rural public school district headquartered in Colo, Iowa. Its elementary school is in Zearing while the middle-high school and district headquarters are in Colo.

The district is mostly in Story County with portions in Hardin and Marshall counties. The district serves Colo, Zearing, and McCallsburg.

There is an agreement with the Des Moines Area Community College (DMACC) Hunziker Career Center in Ames that allows Colo–NESCO High School students to take vocational courses there.

History
The district was established on July 1, 1991, as a result merger between the Colo and NESCO school districts, with the latter serving McCallsburg and Zearing; "NESCO" means "Northeast Story County".

Nora Gordon of University of California, San Diego, and Brian Knight of Brown University noted in Public Finance Review wrote about the per-pupil revenue changes in Colo–NESCO before and after the merger.

Schools
Colo–NESCO Elementary
Colo–NESCO Middle School-High School

Colo–NESCO High School

Athletics 
The Royals compete in the Iowa Star Conference, including the following sports:

Cross county (boys and girls)
Volleyball 
Football 
Basketball (boys and girls)
 Boys' - 1990 Class A state champions
Wrestling 
Track and field (boys and girls)
Golf (boys and girls)
Soccer (boys and girls)
Baseball 
Softball

See also
List of school districts in Iowa
List of high schools in Iowa

References

External links
 Colo–NESCO Community School District
 
  

School districts in Iowa
Education in Hardin County, Iowa
Education in Marshall County, Iowa
Education in Story County, Iowa
1991 establishments in Iowa
School districts established in 1991